Kacper Bieszczad (born 11 September 2002) is a Polish professional footballer who plays as a goalkeeper for Ekstraklasa club Zagłębie Lubin.

Club career
On 12 August 2020 he was loaned to Chrobry Głogów for the 2020–21 season.

Career statistics

Club

Notes

References 

2002 births
People from Krosno
Sportspeople from Podkarpackie Voivodeship
Living people
Polish footballers
Poland youth international footballers
Poland under-21 international footballers
Association football goalkeepers
Zagłębie Lubin players
Chrobry Głogów players
Ekstraklasa players
I liga players
II liga players
III liga players